React to That (stylized as ReactToThat) is an American television series developed by Nick Cannon and Benny and Rafi Fine. It aired on Nickelodeon for over two weeks, beginning on December 15, 2014 and ending on January 1, 2015.

The show is based on the Fine Brothers' React series of videos, which features kids, teens, adults, elders and YouTubers reacting to videos. The show features Reactors from both the Kids React and Teens React series. 13 episodes were ordered by Nickelodeon, but only 12 were aired.

Cast
Abby & Tate
Adam
Aiden
Billy
Brooke Monaé
Bryson
Carly
Carmilla
Casey
Chelsea
Christian
Cooper
Damarr
Dash
Diego
Dylan
Elle
Emma R
Ethan
Evan
Evelyn
Gabrielle
Harrison
Jamie
Jayka
Jayla
Jeannie
Kacey
Krischelle
Lauren Cimorelli & Dani Cimorelli
Lia
Lizzy
Logan
Lucas
Mace
Marlhy
Megan & Shannon
Morgan A
Morgan
Nick
Paris
Paola
Rebecca & Reina
Samirah
Seth
Sular
Sydney
Thomas
Tom
Tori
Troy
Tylen
Tyler
William
Zaire

Segments 
 Finish the Story - One of the Reactors break down their prediction of what happens next in the viral video.
 Challenge - The Reactors try to challenge and attempt to surpass goal and achievements done in the viral videos they watch.
 Don't Smile Challenge - Like on the Try Not To Laugh Challenge, the Reactors have to try to not laugh. If they smile or laugh, they're eliminated.
 Which is...? - The Reactors vote which of the two viral videos is better.
 Real Or Fake - The Reactors determine if the viral video is actually real or faked.
 Remix - Similar to the Challenge Segment, the Reactors try to replicate the stunts and tricks seen on the video.
 What Was Your Favorite? - The concluding segment where the Reactors pick their favorite viral videos of the episode.

Episodes

References 

2010s American reality television series
2014 American television series debuts
2015 American television series endings
English-language television shows
2010s Nickelodeon original programming
American children's reality television series
Television series by Otter Media